Hafez Ghashghaei (born 16 March 1995) is an Iranian weightlifter. He represented Iran at the 2019 World Weightlifting Championships and won the clean and jerk silver medal at 55kg category.

Major results

References

External links 
 

1995 births
Living people
Iranian male weightlifters
21st-century Iranian people
Islamic Solidarity Games competitors for Iran